The 2022–23 Australian Baseball League season is the twelfth season of the Australian Baseball League (ABL). After the COVID-19 pandemic cancelled the 2021–22 season and reduced the 2020–21 season to six teams, this season is expected to be the first in three years not to feel the impact of the COVID-19 pandemic on sports.

Teams 

Both the Auckland Tuatara and Geelong-Korea returned to the competition for the first time since the 2019–20 Australian Baseball League season. The Tuatara purchased the National Basketball League team the Auckland Huskies, who now go by the same name.

Regular season 
The league returned to a 10-round, 40 game schedule, with teams playing division rivals eight times and inter-division teams four times.

Auckland, Brisbane, Canberra and Sydney grouped into the "Northeast Division" with Adelaide, Geelong, Melbourne and Perth grouped into the "Southwest Division".

Scheduled doubleheaders consist of a seven inning game followed by a nine inning game. The league uses the WBSC tiebreaker rule for all games going beyond the 9th inning, or extra innings beginning less than one hour before a curfew.

Baxter Field was previously announced to be hosting the first Australian Baseball League All-Star Game since 2017, but was delayed due to the damage caused by the 2022 eastern Australia floods.

Milestones during the regular season included Tim Atherton becoming the first pitcher to 400 strikeouts. The first Canberra Cavalry player to 300 games for Robbie Perkins and the first Brisbane Bandits player to 350 games for Andrew Campbell.

The Adelaide Giants broke the win streak record with 12 games between 24 November and 10 December 2022. Trent D'Antonio broke the record for most career appearances on 8 January 2023 with 387 games. Dae-sung Koo who held the record for the oldest player to play in the ABL when he pitched an inning for Geelong-Korea at age 48 in 2018, came back out of retirement to break his own record, pitching a scoreless inning against at age 53.

T.J. Bennett broke the single-season homerun record with 17 homeruns, a record he previously held with 16 alongside Kellin Deglan and Donald Lutz.

Standings

The game between Canberra Cavalry and Sydney Blue Sox scheduled for Sunday 23 January was rained out before play could begin. Because that was the last Sunday of the regular season, the game could not be rescheduled, and both teams were awarded a half win per the League's rules.

Statistical leaders

Awards

Postseason 

The playoffs will see four teams compete in two rounds. The semi-final round saw the winner of each division host the runner-up of the other division in a best-of-three series. The winners of each semi-final will compete in a best-of-three final round, with the first game being hosted by the lower seed and the remaining games hosted by the higher seed. This format is similar to that used for the  season.

Semi-Final: Brisbane Bandits (NE1) vs Perth Heat (SW2) 

Brisbane Bandits hosted Perth Heat for a best-of-three semi-final at Viticon Stadium (Holloway Field). Brisbane won the first game, but Perth won the remaining two to secure a place in the finals.

Semi-Final: Adelaide Giants (SW1) vs Auckland Tuatara (NE2) 

Adelaide Giants hosted Auckland Tuatara for a best-of-three semi-final at Diamond Sports Stadium. Game 2 was postponed and moved to the next day due to rain, resulting in double-header being played. Adelaide won the first and third games to secure a place in the final against Perth.

Final: Adelaide Giants (SW1) vs Perth Heat (SW2) 

Adelaide Giants and Perth Heat played a best-of-three final. The first game was hosted by Perth at Empire Ballpark, and the remaining games were hosted by Adelaide at Diamond Sports Stadium.

Adelaide and Perth last faced each other in the final of the 2014–15 Australian Baseball League season, when Perth won the Claxton Shield. Despite Adelaide making the final four times since the ABL's inaugural season in 2010–11, a team from South Australia has not won the Claxton Shield since 1980.

Perth won the first game, but Adelaide won the second and third games and consequently the final, ending South Australia's 43-year Claxton Shield drought. 

Adelaide-born Jordan McArdle was named the Postseason MVP, hitting three home runs across in both of the Giants' Championship Series wins.

References

External links 
The Australian Baseball League – Official ABL Website
Official Baseball Australia Website

Australian Baseball League seasons
Baseball
Baseball
Australian
Australian